Lake City International Film Festival or LACIFF is a 3-day film festival held in Gwalior with a focus on films with themes around Arts, culture, tourism and history.

References

External links
Official Website

Film festivals in India